The  is a Kofun period burial mound located in the Yamahigashi neighborhood of Tenryū-ku, Hamamatsu, Shizuoka Prefecture in the Chūbu region of Japan. The tumulus was designated a National Historic Site of Japan in 2020.

Overview
It is located at the tip of a tongue-shaped hill of the Tenryū River plain in western Shizuoka prefecture, and is one a group of several tumuli. The cluster is named for Kōmyō-ji, a Buddhist temple in the vicinity. 

The tumulus was discovered in 1939, and was made a Shizuoka Prefectural Historic Site in 1955.   An archaeological excavation was conducted from  2017 to 2018. The tumulus is orientated to the south, and has an overall length of 83 meters, making it the largest in Hamamatsu City. The anterior circular portion has a diameter of 45 meters and a height of 7.5 meters and is constructed in two tiers.  Fukiishi and haniwa have been found on the surface of the mound, and the tumulus's unusual in that the fukiishi on the north side of the posterior circular portion remained in almost perfect condition with a height of about 6.8 meters from the base to the top of the mound. The burial chamber remains undiscovered, as the main body of the mound was not excavated. The construction period is estimated to be around the middle of the 5th century, or the middle of the Kofun period based on the shape of the mound and the characteristics of the haniwa. 

This is the only known zenpō-kōen-fun in the Tenryū region. The Akiba Kaidō, an ancient highway connecting southern  Tōtōmi with Shinano and inland reaches of Mikawa runs immediately adjacent to the tumulus. The design of the mound is common to that of the Kinki region of Japan, an dit is assumed to be the tomb of a local king who controlled this transportation route, and who had some connection with the Yamato Kingdom. 

The tumulus is located a ten-minute walk from the "Kōmyōguchi" bus stop on the Entetsu Bus from Hamamatsu Station.  

The Kōmyōsan No.2 Kofun located to the south was am -style circular tumulus with a diameter of 33 meters, but it has now been destroyed.

Gallery

See also
List of Historic Sites of Japan (Shizuoka)

References

External links

Hamamtsu city official home page 

Kofun
History of Shizuoka Prefecture
Hamamatsu
Historic Sites of Japan
Archaeological sites in Japan